Mahirah Izzati Ismail (born 12 April 2000) is a Malaysian cricketer. She made her Women's Twenty20 International (WT20I) debut for Malaysia on 3 June 2018, in the 2018 Women's Twenty20 Asia Cup. In April 2021, she was one of 15 players to be awarded a contract by the Malaysian Cricket Association, the first time female cricketers for the Malaysian team had been granted contracts.

In November 2021, she was named in Malaysia's side for the 2021 ICC Women's T20 World Cup Asia Qualifier tournament in the United Arab Emirates.
In October 2022, she played for Malaysia in Women's Twenty20 Asia Cup.

References

External links
 

2000 births
Living people
Malaysian women cricketers
Malaysia women Twenty20 International cricketers
Southeast Asian Games medalists in cricket
Southeast Asian Games bronze medalists for Malaysia
Competitors at the 2017 Southeast Asian Games
21st-century Malaysian women